Chuladeh (also Romanized as Chūlādeh) is a village in Khotbeh Sara Rural District, Kargan Rud District, Talesh County, Gilan Province, Iran. At the 2006 census, its population was 26, in 7 families.

References 

Populated places in Talesh County